Mao Renfeng (5 January 1898 – 11 December 1956) was a Republic of China general and spymaster who headed the Bureau of Investigation and Statistics (BIS, also known as the Counterintelligence Bureau and after 1955 the Intelligence Bureau) from 1946 until his death, succeeding his childhood friend Dai Li who died in a plane crash in 1946. Between 1946 and 1949, his spy agency played a prominent role in the Chinese Civil War. In 1949 he along with the rest of the Nationalist government fled to Taiwan where he died 7 years later.

Since 25 May 1955, Mao's BIS secret agents co-operating with the political warfare officers and the military police began to arrest the subordinates of General Sun Li-jen to interrogate with torture for being pro-American in an allegedly coup d'état against Chiang Kai-shek's regime to collaborate with the Central Intelligence Agency in taking control of Taiwan to declare the Taiwanese independence; until October, over 300 officers were arrested and imprisoned by the BIS and the Taiwan Garrison Command for the high treason by the conspired revolt with the Communist spies. General Sun was also put in the house arrest for 33 years until 20 March 1988, which consisted in one of the political persecution cases in the White Terror history.

His son Robert Yu-Lang Mao is currently the chairman of Hewlett-Packard China.

References

1898 births
1956 deaths
Taiwanese people from Zhejiang
People from Jiangshan
Politicians from Quzhou
Republic of China politicians from Zhejiang
Members of the Kuomintang
Spymasters